The Argentine Federation of Associations of Teachers of English (FAAPI) is a registered non-profit organization founded in 1971. Through 27 regional associations of teachers of English in Argentina, FAAPI affiliates all certified Teachers of English as a Foreign Language holding degrees granted by universities and other teachers’ training colleges recognized by the National Ministry of Culture and Education. FAAPI’s goal is to encourage continuous professional development among its members. FAAPI is also an associate member of IATEFL (International Association of Teachers of English as a Foreign Language).

Associations 
FAAPI  currently has 21 associations of teachers of English from different parts of Argentina. Each organizes a range of local activities such as workshops, conferences, lectures or webinars. 
The delegates of the local associations vote during the annual general meeting to form FAAPI’s Board of Directors

Conferences 
Each year one of the regional associations, together with the board of directors organizes an annual three-day conference. Researchers, teachers, teacher trainers, and students from Argentina and other countries attend plenaries, semi-plenaries, workshops, research reports and state-of-the-art reports in this conference. There are also commercial presentations.

Publications 
FAAPI leads the Argentinian Journal of Applied Linguistics (AJAL). This open-access e-journal is aimed at teachers and researchers interested in sharing their expertise, experience, and concerns in the fields of Applied Linguistics and English Language Teaching.  AJAL welcomes original research articles, state-of-the-art articles, literature reviews, materials reviews, and classroom accounts which focus on practical aspects.

Also, after each annual congress, a summary of the most salient presentations is published. They are available free of charge on FAAPI's Website

References

Language education organizations
Language education in Argentina
Professional associations based in Argentina